American Blues Theater is a nonprofit, professional Equity theater company in Chicago, Illinois, United States. The ensemble currently has 30 members.

History 
American Blues Theater was founded in 1985 as a company dedicated to new and classic American plays. Richard Christiansen of the Chicago Tribune cited the theater as one of three companies in his editorial "Chicago Theater Forges New Standards of Glory."

From 1997–2009, the company was led by artistic directors from outside of the ensemble. Under this leadership from 1997 to 2007, the theater's name changed to the American Theater Company (ATC), the mission statement was revised, and the business expanded significantly. In 2008, under new management, the ensemble theater practice was dismantled. After 18 months of talks with new management, all four founders and every ensemble member before 2008 left the ATC in March 2009 citing "major administrative and artistic differences."

The ensemble immediately reformed under its original name of the American Blues Theater. The founding board members reconstituted the board, and ensemble member Gwendolyn Whiteside became the artistic director. Under her leadership, American Blues has expanded the ensemble and diversified its base of artists. Whiteside established the annual Blue Ink Award for playwriting, incorporated community service into the company's mission, and developed arts education programming for Chicago Public Schools, which serves just under 4,000 students annually.

After more than three decades as an itinerant theater, in 2022 American Blues Theater purchased a 17,965 sq ft property at 5627 N. Lincoln Ave. in Chicago to transform into its first permanent home. The venue will include a 148-seat proscenium and a 40-seat flexible studio. The venue will be designed by John Morris of Morris Architects Planners with theater systems supported by Schuler Shook. The company anticipates opening the venue in November 2023.

Community service
American Blues Theater provides community service for not-for-profit organizations such as The Family Institute at Northwestern University, Chicago Public Schools, American Indian Center, HANA Center, Chicago Latina Moms, American Foundation for Suicide Prevention, and the United Service Organizations. Since 2009, the theater has held food and book drives, distributed promotional tickets, and raised awareness for children's surgeries and health needs. It also donate proceeds from "Pediatric Previews" to Lurie Children's Hospital of Chicago.

Awards

The theater is a previous winner of American Theatre Wing's National Theatre Company Award.

As of 2020, the theater and artists have 221 Jeff Awards and nominations, marking distinction in Chicago theater, and 40 Black Theater Alliance Awards.

Production History 
More than half of the mainstage productions are world and Chicago premieres. The theater's new play development consists of a variety of programs, including world and Chicago premieres, the Blue Ink Award for playwriting, Blueprint play development, and the annual festival of short plays, The Ripped Festival.

+ indicates World Premiere production

Season 1 (1985)
 Dogman's Last Stand by Rick Cleveland +

Season 2 (1986)
 Geography of a Horse Dreamer by Sam Shepard
 Hawk Moon by Sam Shepard

Season 3 (1987)
 Summer Brave by William Inge
 The Hairy Ape by Eugene O'Neill

Season 4 (1988)
 Bad Moon by Rick Cleveland +

Season 5 (1989–1990)
 Desire Under the Elms by Eugene O'Neill
 Peacekeeper by Keith Reddin

Season 6 (1991)
 Monsters: Glimpses of Urban Lunacy +

Season 7 (1992)
 Monsters II: Visiting Hours +

Season 8 (1993)
 Food From Trash by Gary Leon Hill

Season 9 (1994)
 Monsters III: The El Ride +
 On the Waterfront by Budd Schulberg and Stan Silverman +

Season 10 (1995–1996)
 Keely and Du by Jane Martin
 Tom and Jerry by Rick Cleveland +
 The Homage That Follows" by Mark Medoff

Season 11 (1996–1997)
 The Flight of the Phoenix by Tim Hendrickson +
 Don't Disappoint Captain January by Joseph Urbinato +
 Stalag 17 by Donald Bevan and Edmund Trzcinski (co-production with Harvest Productions)
 Train of Thought by Andrew Micheli +
 Toys in the Attic by Lillian Hellman

Season 12 (1997–1998)
 A Stone Carver by William Mastrosimone
 Scapin adapted from Molière by Bill Irwin and Mark O'Donnell
 Bus Stop by William Inge
 The Million Bells of Ocean by Edward Mast

Season 13 (1998–1999)
 The Threepenny Opera by Bertolt Brecht and Kurt Weill
 One Day Only by Edward Mast +
 Pledge of Allegiance by Mark R. Giesser
 Below the Belt by Richard Dresser
 La Tectonica de las Nubes/Cloud Tectonics by Jose Rivera (co-production with Centro Cultural Helenico, Mexico City) +

Season 14 (1999–2000)
 The Skin of Our Teeth by Thornton Wilder
 American Buffalo by David Mamet
 Medea by Euripides, translated by Nicholas Rudall +
 The Mineola Twins by Paula Vogel

Season 15 (2000–2001)
 Endgame by Samuel Beckett
 Working by Stephen Schwartz and Nina Faso
 Vick's Boy by Ben Bettenbender
 Catch 22 by Joseph Heller +

Season 16 (2001–2002)
 A Lie of the Mind by Sam Shepard
 Flung by Lisa Dillman
 The Trip to Bountiful by Horton Foote

Season 17 (2002–2003)
 Quake by Melanie Marnich
 Where Have You Gone, Jimmy Stewart?" by Art Shay +
 Two Rooms" by Lee Blessing
 The Hairy Ape by Eugene O'Neill

Season 18 (2003–2004)
 Tintypes by Scott Joplin, George M. Cohan, John Philip Sousa, and others
 Angel City by Sam Shepard
 American Dead by Brett Neveu +
 Strictly Dishonorable by Preston Sturges

Season 19 (2004–2005)
 A View from the Bridge by Arthur Miller
 It's a Wonderful Life: A Live Radio Play adapted by Joe Landry from the film by Frank Capra
 Kid Simple by Jordan Harrison
 Living Out by Lisa Loomer (co-produced with Teatro Vista)

Season 20 (2005–2006)
 Orpheus Descending by Tennessee Williams
 It's a Wonderful Life: A Live Radio Play by the American Blues Theater Ensemble
 St. Scarlet by Julia Jordan
 Heritage by Brett Neveu +

Season 21 (2006–2007)
 The Dark at the Top of the Stairs by William Inge
 It's a Wonderful Life: A Live Radio Play by the American Blues Theater Ensemble
 Oklahoma! by Richard Rodgers and Oscar Hammerstein II
 Half of Plenty by Lisa Dillman +

Season 22 (2007–2008)
 I Do! I Do! by Tom Jones and Harvey Schmidt
 It's a Wonderful Life: The Radio Play by the American Blues Theater Ensemble
 Augusta by Richard Dresser
 Speech & Debate by Stephen Karam

Season 23 (2008–2009)
 People's Temple by Leigh Fondakowski
 Celebrity Row by Itamar Moses
 It's a Wonderful Life: The Radio Play by the American Blues Theater Ensemble
 Topdog/Underdog by Suzan-Lori Parks
 True West by Sam Shepard

Season 24 (2009–2010)
 It's a Wonderful Life: Live at the Biograph! by the American Blues Theater Ensemble +
 Tobacco Road by Jack Kirkland

Season 25 (2010–2011)
 It's a Wonderful Life: Live at the Biograph! by the American Blues Theater Ensemble
 Rantoul and Die by Mark Roberts

Season 26 (2011–2012)
 Waiting for Lefty by Clifford Odets
 It's a Wonderful Life: Live at the Biograph! by the American Blues Theater Ensemble

Season 27 (2012–2013)
 Illegal Use of Hands by James Still +
 It's a Wonderful Life: Live at the Biograph! by the American Blues Theater Ensemble
 Collected Stories by Donald Margulies

Season 28 (2013–2014)
 Hank Williams: Lost Highway by Randal Myler and Mark Harelik
 It's a Wonderful Life: Live in Chicago! by the American Blues Theater Ensemble +
 American Myth by Christina Gorman
 Grounded by George Brant

Season 29 (2014–15)
 Hank Williams: Lost Highway by Randal Myler and Mark Harelik
 Native Son adapted by Nambi E. Kelley (co-production with Court Theatre) +
 It's a Wonderful Life: Live in Chicago by the American Blues Theater Ensemble
 Yankee Tavern by Steven Dietz
 Side Man by Warren Leight

Season 30 (2015–16)
 The Rainmaker by N. Richard Nash
 It's a Wonderful Life: Live in Chicago! by the American Blues Theater Ensemble
 Looking Over the President's Shoulder by James Still
 Little Shop of Horrors by Howard Ashman and Alan Menken

Season 31 (2016–17)
 Dutchman by Amiri Baraka & TRANSit by Darren Canady +
 It's a Wonderful Life: Live in Chicago by the American Blues Theater Ensemble
 The Columnist by David Auburn

Season 32 (2017–18)
 Beauty's Daughter by Dael Orlandersmith
 It's a Wonderful Life: Live in Chicago by the American Blues Theater Ensemble
 Six Corners by Keith Huff +
 Buddy – The Buddy Holly Story by Alan James

Season 33 (2018–19)
 Flyin' West by Pearl Cleage
 It's a Wonderful Life: Live in Chicago by the American Blues Theater Ensemble
 On Clover Road by Steven Dietz
 The Absolute Brightness of Leonard Pelkey by Celeste Lecesne
 The Spitfire Grill by James Valeq & Fred Alley

Season 34 (2019–20)
 Five Presidents by Rick Cleveland
 It's a Wonderful Life: Live in Chicago by the American Blues Theater Ensemble
 Roan @ The Gates by Christina Telesca

Season 35 (2020–21)
 It's a Wonderful Life: Live in Chicago by the American Blues Theater Ensemble (live interactive show on Zoom)

Season 36 (2021–22)
 It's a Wonderful Life: Live in Chicago by the American Blues Theater Ensemble
 Stand Up If You're Here Tonight by John Kolvenbach

Season 37 (2022–23)
 Fences by August Wilson
 Alma by Benjamin Benne +
 It's a Wonderful Life: Live in Chicago by the American Blues Theater Ensemble

Blue Ink Award for playwriting
American Blues Theater’s nationally-renowned Blue Ink Award for playwriting was created in 2010 to support new work. Each year the theater accepts worldwide submissions of original, unpublished full-length plays. The winning play is selected by the Artistic Director and the theater’s Ensemble.

Since inception, 12 Award winners, 112 finalists, and 171 semi-finalists have been named. Recent winners include:
 2022 – The Reapers on Woodbrook Avenue by Mardee Bennett
 2021 – Refugee Rhapsody by Yussef El Guindi
 2020 – Recent Unsettling Events by Andrea Stolowitz
 2019 – Alma by Benjamin Benne | world premiere American Blues Theater, Chicago, 2022; Center Theater Group, L.A., 2022
 2018 – Welcome to Matteson! by Inda Craig-Galván
 2017 – Hype Man by Idris Goodwin | world premiere Company One, Boston, 2018
 2016 – The Wind and the Breeze by Nathan Alan Davis | world premiere Cygnet Theatre, San Diego, 2018
 2015 – Other Than Honorable by Jamie Pachino | world premiere Geva Theatre Center, NY, 2017
 2014 – Comden Mall Community Activists by Douglas Post
 2013 – Graveyard of Empires by Elaine Romero | world premiere 16th Street Theater, Chicago, 2015
 2012 – American Myth'' by Christina Telesca | world premiere American Blues Theater, Chicago, 2014
 2011 – American Home by Stephanie Walker | world premiere, Pasadena, CA, 2017

References

 Olympia Dukakis to Participate in American Blues Theater's 'Rebirth of Blues' Benefit, 11/16
 

Theatre companies in Chicago